Tafod y Ddraig (which translates as "The Dragon's Tongue"), or Tafod, is a monthly Welsh language magazine dedicated to the promotion and preservation of the Welsh language. This magazine was the only voice of Cymdeithas yr Iaith Gymraeg (the Welsh Language Society) from its foundation in October 1963 by Owain Owain. It is still published by the Society under the title Tafod ("Tongue"), approximately quarterly to coincide with events such as the National Eisteddfod.

Tafod y Ddraig was published before the society became known: indeed, the dragon's tongue logo (also created by Owain) was sketched before the society had a constitution. It can be seen today at the National Library of Wales.

References

External links 
 The Welsh Language Society

Welsh-language magazines
Magazines published in Wales
Welsh language
Politics of Wales
Magazines established in 1963
1963 establishments in Wales
Monthly magazines published in the United Kingdom